The Northmont City School District is a school district in the U.S. state of Ohio that serves the areas of Clayton, Englewood, Union, Clay Township, and Philipsburg.

Northmont City School District was created by the Consolidation of Philipsburg, Randolph, and Clayton School districts in 1959.

Current Schools

Former Schools
Old Northmont High School, formerly located on property of current high school.
O.R. Edgington Elementary, formerly known as Randolph High School, Northmont Jr. High, and Randolph Elementary,
Phillipsburg Elementary, formerly known as Phillipsburg School,
Clayton Elementary, formerly known as Clayton School.

See also
List of school districts in Ohio

External links
Official website

Education in Montgomery County, Ohio
School districts in Ohio